Vanusa Santos Flores (22 September 1947 – 8 November 2020) was a Brazilian singer, linked to the Jovem Guarda movement. She released many solo albums, most of them self-titled.

Career
She gained national attention in March 2009, when she sang the Brazilian National Anthem at the Legislative Assembly of São Paulo. Accompanied by a couple of musicians, she committed many lyrical mistakes during her performance, and ended up singing out of rhythm. Attenders of the show tried to prevent her from continuing by applauding before the end of the presentation, and she kept on singing until the presenter eventually thanked Vanusa for her performance, with her still singing on the background. She later stated that she was confused because of the medicine she took that morning for her labyrinthitis, and said she would hire a lawyer to have any suggestion that she was drunk removed from the internet.

Discography
1968 – Vanusa
1969 – Vanusa vol.2
1971 – Vanusa vol.3
1973 – Vanusa vol.4
1974 – Vanusa vol.5
1975 – Amigos Novos E Antigos
1977 – Trinta Anos
1977 – Cinderela 77 – Participação na tilha sonora da novela Cinderela 77
1979 – Viva Vanusa
1980 – Vanusa vol.6
1981 – Vanusa vol.7
1982 – Primeira Estrela
1985 – Vanusa vol.8
1986 – Mudanças
1988 – Cheiro De Luz
1991 – Viva Paixão
1994 – Hino Ao Amor
1997 – A Arte Do Espetáculo
2004 – Diferente
2013 – Estrada de Bênçãos

References

 [ Vanusa] at allmusic

External links
 
 

1947 births
2020 deaths
People from Cruzeiro, São Paulo
Música Popular Brasileira singers
Jovem Guarda
20th-century Brazilian women singers
20th-century Brazilian singers
Brazilian rock singers
21st-century Brazilian women singers
21st-century Brazilian singers